Leoncio Lara Álvarez  (known professionally as Leoncio "Bon" Lara; born 9 August 1965) is a Mexican film composer.

His notable works include Top Cat: The Movie, Rudo y Cursi, and the Leyendas animated franchise. He was a member and principal songwriter of his former band, Bon y los Enemigos del Silencio.

Early life
Leoncio Lara was raised and born in Chihuahua, Chihuahua, Mexico.

Career
Lara began his film career in 1992 with the film Marea Suave.

Filmography

Television

Film

1990s

2000s

2010s

TBA

References

External links

1965 births
Mexican film score composers
Male film score composers
Living people
Mexican rock musicians
People from Chihuahua City